Mehdi Ansari (born 29 October 1994) is an Iranian swimmer. He competed in the men's 50 metre butterfly and men's 100 metre butterfly events at the 2017 World Aquatics Championships.

References

1994 births
Living people
Iranian male swimmers
Place of birth missing (living people)
Swimmers at the 2014 Asian Games
Swimmers at the 2018 Asian Games
Asian Games competitors for Iran
Male butterfly swimmers
Islamic Solidarity Games competitors for Iran